Walter Burrell (15 April 1777 – 7 April 1831)  was an English Tory politician who sat in the House of Commons from 1812 to 1831.

Biography
He was the son of William And Sophia Burell.
Burrell was educated at Westminster School where he may have taken part in the first school cricket match in 1794 between Westminster and Charterhouse School.

Marriage
He married Helen Anne Chisholm (1790-1874)daugther of a Canadian Merchant on 21 July  at St. George Hanover Square,London,England.

Political Career
Burrell was elected at the 1812 general election as Member of Parliament (MP) for Sussex. He was re-elected three times, and held the seat until his death shortly before the 1831 general election

References

External links 
 

1777 births
1831 deaths
Tory MPs (pre-1834)
Members of the Parliament of the United Kingdom for English constituencies
UK MPs 1812–1818
UK MPs 1818–1820
UK MPs 1820–1826
UK MPs 1826–1830
UK MPs 1830–1831